The eighteenth season of the One Piece anime series was produced by Toei Animation, and directed by Toshinori Fukuzawa, Satoshi Ito, and Tatsuya Nagamine. The season began broadcasting in Japan on Fuji Television from June 26, 2016 to April 2, 2017. Like the rest of the series, it follows the adventures of Monkey D. Luffy and his Straw Hat Pirates. 

"Silver Mine" deals with Luffy and Bartolomeo getting kidnapped by the Silver Pirate Alliance. The story arc, called "Zou", adapts material beginning from the middle of the 80th volume to the middle of the 82nd volume of the manga by Eiichiro Oda. The Straw Hats arrived at Zou to reunite with Sanji and the others, only to discover Sanji has been swept up in a personal conflict and that Zou has been under siege by the Beasts Pirates. "Marine Rookie" deals with Luffy robbing a marine base for food after running out of it on the ship.

Only a single piece of theme music is used for this season. The opening theme, titled , is performed by Kishidan and Hiroshi Kitadani. However, from episodes 753-756 in the Japanese broadcast only due to licensing issues and to promote One Piece Film: Gold, there is a special opening movie featuring scenes from the afterformentioned film.



Episode list

Home releases

Japanese

English

Notes

References
General

Specific

2016 Japanese television seasons
2017 Japanese television seasons
One Piece seasons
One Piece episodes